North Carolina's 67th House district is one of 120 districts in the North Carolina House of Representatives. It has been represented by Republican Wayne Sasser since 2019.

Geography
Since 2023, the district has included all of Stanly and Montgomery counties. The district overlaps with the 29th and 33rd Senate districts.

District officeholders

Election results

2022

2020

2018

2016

2014

2012

2010

2008

2006

2004

2002

2000

References

North Carolina House districts
Stanly County, North Carolina
Montgomery County, North Carolina